Alex Greaux (born 22 September 1977) is a retired Puerto Rican steeplechaser who competed in the 2004 Summer Olympics.

Competition record

References

1977 births
Living people
Puerto Rican male middle-distance runners
Pan American Games competitors for Puerto Rico
Athletes (track and field) at the 2003 Pan American Games
Athletes (track and field) at the 2007 Pan American Games
Olympic track and field athletes of Puerto Rico
Athletes (track and field) at the 2004 Summer Olympics
Puerto Rican male steeplechase runners
Central American and Caribbean Games gold medalists for Puerto Rico
Competitors at the 2002 Central American and Caribbean Games
Competitors at the 2006 Central American and Caribbean Games
Competitors at the 2010 Central American and Caribbean Games
Central American and Caribbean Games medalists in athletics